Sane Advice is the fifth and final solo studio album by American comedian and actress LaWanda Page, released on the Mute Records label with just the first name of her stage name, LaWanda (her real name being Alberta Peal).

This was her first and only "clean" record, leaving off the explicit humor from her previous albums. The album features more of an improvisational and personal view of the entertainer's life than in previous recordings, and features no second-long monologues. The comic mocked the traditional gospel song, "Glory, Glory, Hallelujah (Lay My Burden Down)", using the words "since I laid my old man down".

No date is known of its recording but Laff Records released the album in 1979, two years after Page's tenure as Aunt Esther on "Sanford & Son" ended with the show's cancellation in 1977.

While Page continued to perform stand-up, continuing her raunchy monologue bits until illness derailed her in the mid-1990s, this was the last album the comic released after her Laff contract was terminated following this album's release.

Track listing
"Since I Laid My Old Man Down"
"Test Tube Babies"
"Husband"
"Show Biz, Honey!"
"Sane Advice"
"Beverly Watts"
"Pastor's Angels"
"Mother's Day"
"Bible Cake"

1979 albums
LaWanda Page albums
Laff Records albums